Roselawn is a census-designated place (CDP) in Newton and Jasper counties in the U.S. state of Indiana. The population was 4,131 at the 2010 census.

Roselawn is known within northwestern Indiana for the two nudist resorts which operate in this town: the Ponderosa Sun Club and Sun Aura. Sun Aura resort was previously known as Naked City, but closed in 1986 after its operator, Dick Drost, encountered significant legal troubles. The resort continued to operate under several different owners and was known as Sunspot resort prior to becoming Sun Aura. The clubs are long-standing fixtures of the community, dating to the 1930s.

History
Roselawn was laid out in 1882. The community's name is an amalgamation of the names of early merchants Orlando Rose and Lon Craig. A post office has been in operation at Roselawn since 1881.

On October 31, 1994, American Eagle Flight 4184 crashed at Roselawn, killing all 64 passengers and four crew members aboard.

Geography
The original center of Roselawn is in northeastern Newton County, with the CDP extending eastward into northwestern Jasper County. Indiana State Road 10 passes through the community, leading east and north  to DeMotte, and west the same distance to Lake Village. Interstate 65 passes through the eastern part of the community, with access from Exit 230 (State Road 10); I-65 leads north  to Gary and south  to Lafayette.

Demographics

As of the census of 2000, there were 3,933 people, 1,286 households, and 1,099 families residing in the CDP. The racial makeup of the CDP was 97.30% White, 0.15% African American, 0.13% Native American, 0.28% Asian, 0.18% Pacific Islander, 0.97% from other races, and 0.99% from two or more races. Hispanic or Latino of any race were 3.33% of the population.

There were 1,286 households, out of which 41.4% had children under the age of 18 living with them, 71.7% were married couples living together, 9.2% had a female householder with no husband present, and 14.5% were non-families. 11.7% of all households were made up of individuals, and 3.0% had someone living alone who was 65 years of age or older. The average household size was 2.99 and the average family size was 3.22.

In the CDP, the population was spread out, with 29.3% under the age of 18, 7.5% from 18 to 24, 29.6% from 25 to 44, 24.7% from 45 to 64, and 8.9% who were 65 years of age or older. The median age was 34 years. For every 100 females, there were 101.3 males. For every 100 females age 18 and over, there were 96.5 males.

The median income for a household in the CDP was $48,625, and the median income for a family was $49,351. Males had a median income of $42,284 versus $18,208 for females. The per capita income for the CDP was $19,136. About 4.3% of families and 3.9% of the population were below the poverty line, including 3.0% of those under age 18 and none of those age 65 or over.

Education
Roselawn has a public library, a branch of the Newton County Public Library.

References

Census-designated places in Newton County, Indiana
Census-designated places in Indiana
Census-designated places in Jasper County, Indiana
Northwest Indiana